DC 9/11: Time of Crisis is a 2003 docudrama television movie which re-enacts the events of the September 11 attacks in 2001 as seen from the point of view of the President of the United States and his staff. It was directed by Brian Trenchard-Smith and starred Timothy Bottoms as President George W. Bush.

Premise
DC 9/11: Time of Crisis is a film concerning the events of 9/11 as they unfolded from the perspective of President George W. Bush and his Cabinet. The film follows the 10 days following the attacks up to September 20, 2001 when President Bush gave his Address to the nation on the same day. DC 9/11: Time of Crisis was succeeded by The Path to 9/11, in which Penny Johnson Jerald reprised her role as Condoleezza Rice.

Plot
On the morning of September 11, 2001, United States Secretary of Defense Donald Rumsfeld is eating breakfast at the Pentagon with several members of the US Congress, hoping to procure an increase to the US defense budget. Rumsfeld says that they will soon need the funding as "something" is likely to occur soon given recent provocations by terrorists and rogue states.

As hijacked airplanes crash into New York's World Trade Center, US President George W. Bush is at Emma E. Booker Elementary School in Florida. White House Chief of Staff Andrew Card informs him that "a second plane has hit the second tower, America is under attack." After a few minutes, Bush prepares to leave the school, interrupting a reporter's question so as to not alarm schoolchildren as to the events unfolding in New York.

Bush then orders Rumsfeld to take the US to DEFCON 3, putting the US Armed Forces in high alert. He discusses the situation with US Vice President Dick Cheney and order the grounding of all civil aviation. He leaves Florida on Air Force One headed for Washington, DC. While in the air, Naval Intelligence uncovers a credible threat against "Angel" (the day's codeword for Air Force One). Fighter jets escort the plane in response.

The US Secret Service evacuates the White House of non-essential personnel while US Cabinet members are escorted to the Presidential Emergency Operations Center. Cheney and National Security Advisor Condoleezza Rice are informed that there is a non-responsive aircraft headed for Camp David. Cheney orders fighter jets to attempt contact, stating that if the plane does not respond or turn around it is to be shot down. The plane disappears off radar; Cheney assumes he has just caused the deaths of those on board. Bush is apprised of the situation and is told that the FAA suggests that the military did not shoot down the plane, but rather a group of passengers learned of the events in New York and took matters into their own hands. Bush wants to head back to Washington, DC, and after conferencing with the George Tenet, Director of Central Intelligence, and other members of his cabinet, he orders that Air Force One head there immediately.

Bush arrives at the White House that evening and addresses the US people, informing them that they are now in a "War on Terror". Over the next hours and days, Bush consoles survivors and meets numerous times with his cabinet to determine an appropriate response, which ultimately leads to his declaration that "either you are with us or you are with the terrorists" and the subsequent wars in both Afghanistan and Iraq.

Background information

Production
The writer wanted a sense of authenticity to underpin the film. To achieve this a vast amounts of research were conducted which included an interview with President Bush, which led to true scenes appearing in the film, such as: Rumsfeld's early breakfast meeting on the morning of September 11, Cheney ordering the plane being shot down, and President Bush receiving PAPD Officer George Howard's badge from his grieving mother Arlene. The writer wanted to answer a number of questions many people had that day, most notably where was President Bush and why was he out of contact for so long.

Cast
Timothy Bottoms previously played George W. Bush (in a comedic fashion) in the short-lived sitcom That's My Bush! as well as in The Crocodile Hunter: Collision Course.

Fellow cast members Gregory Itzin (John Ashcroft) and Penny Johnson Jerald (Condoleezza Rice) have also portrayed major (fictional) political figures on the series 24. Itzin played President Charles Logan during seasons 4 and 5 while Jerald played Sherry Palmer, the manipulative ex-wife of President David Palmer, during the first three seasons. Jerald also reprised playing Condoleezza Rice in 2006's The Path to 9/11.

Cast

Reception
The film was met with mild controversy during production and upon broadcast on the Showtime network in the United States. The film was also praised by the political right for portraying Bush's strong leadership in a time of crisis, while Michael Moore and others on the political left have branded the film as propagandistic for attempting to portray Bush as a strong leader in complete command of the situation, and also attempting a rebuttal to the suggestion that behind the scenes Cheney was running the show.

DVD release

References

External links
 
 

American television films
Films based on the September 11 attacks
Cultural depictions of George W. Bush
2003 drama films
2003 television films
2003 films
Films about presidents of the United States
Films set in Frederick County, Maryland
Films set in Virginia
Films set in Nebraska
Films set in Louisiana
Films set in Pennsylvania
Films set in New York City
Films directed by Brian Trenchard-Smith